The badminton competitions at the 2017 Southeast Asian Games in Kuala Lumpur were held at Axiata Arena in Bukit Jalil.

The 2017 Games featured competitions in seven events (men 3 events, women 3 events, and mixed 1 events).

Participating nations

Medal summary

Medalists

Medal standings

See also
Badminton at the 2017 ASEAN Para Games

References

External links
  

 
Badminton tournaments in Malaysia